I Wanna Be Free may refer to:

 "I Wanna Be Free" (The Monkees song), 1967
 "I Wanna Be Free" (Loretta Lynn song), 1971
 I Wanna Be Free (album), a 1971 album by Loretta Lynn
 "I Wanna Be Free", a song by Patti Labelle from Diary of a Mad Black Woman

See also
 "I Want to Be Free", a 1981 song by Toyah
 "I Want to Be Free" (Elvis Presley song), 1958